Petts Wood railway station is on the South Eastern Main Line, serving Petts Wood in the London Borough of Bromley, south-eastern Greater London. It is in Travelcard zone 5.

It has four platform faces on islands located between the slow and fast pairs of tracks. To the north of the station is Petts Wood Junction, where the up (London-bound) and down (country-bound) loop lines link the lines from Charing Cross and Victoria. The station is managed by Southeastern. There is a waiting room serving the two slow lines. The booking office, Oystercard readers, and ticket machines are all situated at footbridge level; this footbridge is always open to non-passengers.

History 
The station was built on the main line to the north of Orpington and opened on 9 July 1928, initially as a single island platform, with the first tickets printed showing the name as Pett's Wood. The residential areas now surrounding it developed from that date: now the railway divides Petts Wood East and Petts Wood West.

Connections
London Buses routes 208, 273, R3, R7 and night route N199 serve the station.

Services 

The typical off-peak service in trains per hour is:

 2 tph to London Cannon Street (all stations except Lewisham)
 2 tph to  via 

During the peak hours, the station is also served by a number of trains between Orpington,   and  via  which are operated by Thameslink.

On Sundays, the services between Orpington and London Cannon Street do not run.

See also
Murder of Deborah Linsley – unsolved murder of a woman that occurred on a train travelling between Petts Wood and London Victoria in 1988

References

External links 

Railway stations in the London Borough of Bromley
DfT Category C2 stations
Former Southern Railway (UK) stations
Railway stations in Great Britain opened in 1928
Railway stations served by Southeastern
Railway stations served by Govia Thameslink Railway